Ian Drohan (born 22 August 1932 – 28 July 2019) was an Australian rules footballer who played with St Kilda in the Victorian Football League (VFL).

Notes

External links 

1932 births
2019 deaths
Australian rules footballers from Victoria (Australia)
St Kilda Football Club players